Duke Thomas may refer to:

 Duke Thomas (character)
 Duke Thomas (American football) (born 1994)